1977 World Cup may refer to:
 1977 Rugby League World Cup
 1977 World Cup (men's golf)
 1977 IAAF World Cup